In the year 2017, North Korea was involved in the 2017 North Korea crisis, along with other events. The country conducted a nuclear test in September, and several missile tests throughout the year. One of these was the country's first successful test of an intercontinental ballistic missile (ICBM), Hwasong-14. Two missiles were launched over Hokkaido in the Japanese archipelago, in August and in September 2017.

Incumbents
 Party Chairman and State Chairman: Kim Jong-un
 President of the Supreme People's Assembly: Kim Yong-nam
 Premier: Pak Pong-ju

Events
Note that the dates mostly reflect the publication of the news. News that span more than one day are usually listed according to the earliest day the event begun or was reported, or, they are listed by month but not by day.

January

February

March

April

May

June

July

August

September

October

November

Other
 North Korea's 2017 calendar has 71 public holidays, which is two more than in 2016.
 N.K. participates in the Asian Winter Games, hosted in Japan.

See also

 2017 DPR Korea League
 2017 North Korean missile tests
 List of years in North Korea
 North Korea at the 2017 World Aquatics Championships
 North Korea at the 2017 World Championships in Athletics

References

Further reading

External links

 UN Security Council Documents for DPRK (North Korea) (UNSC Resolutions and statements)
 UN Security Council Reports on the DPRK (North Korea) (UNSC Reports)
 UN Security Council Committee Established Pursuant to Resolution 1718 (2006) (Reports issued by the UN Panel of Experts, established to support of the Sanctions Committee in carrying out its mandate as specified in paragraph 12 of resolution 1718)
 Report on Human Rights Abuses or Censorship in North Korea, by U.S. Department of State (January 11, 2017) (archived here)
 Kim Jong-un New Year's speech – YouTube

 
Years of the 21st century in North Korea
North Korea
North Korea
2010s in North Korea